Donald Magruder Scott (November 5, 1894 – October 8, 1980) was an American middle-distance runner and modern pentathlete. He competed in the 800 metres at the 1920 Summer Olympics and the modern pentathlon at the 1924 Summer Olympics.

References

External links
 

1894 births
1980 deaths
American male middle-distance runners
American male modern pentathletes
Athletes (track and field) at the 1920 Summer Olympics
Olympic track and field athletes of the United States
Olympic modern pentathletes of the United States
Modern pentathletes at the 1924 Summer Olympics
People from Woodville, Mississippi
Track and field athletes from Mississippi
19th-century American people
20th-century American people